This is the list of Love Thy Neighbour episodes. This list contains each and every episode of Love Thy Neighbour originally broadcast between 13 April 1972 and 15 January 1976, thus includes the unaired pilot which was never broadcast.

Episodes

Pilot (1972) 
Episode 0 (unaired)

Series 1 (1972) 
Episode 1 (13 Apr 72)  
Episode 2 (20 Apr 72)
Episode 3 (27 Apr 72)
Episode 4 (4 May 72)
Episode 5 (11 May 72)
Episode 6 (18 May 72)
Episode 7 (25 May 72)

Series 2 (1972) 
Episode 8 (11 Sep 72)
Episode 9 (18 Sep 72)
Episode 10 (25 Sep 72)
Episode 11 (2 Oct 72)
Episode 12 (9 Oct 72)
Episode 13 (16 Oct 72)

All Star Comedy Carnival (1972) 
Short Sketch (25 Dec 72)

Series 3 (1973) 
Episode 14 (19 Mar 73)
Episode 15 (26 Mar 73)
Episode 16 (2 Apr 73)
Episode 17 (9 Apr 73)
Episode 18 (16 Apr 73)
Episode 19 (30 Apr 73)

Series 4 (1973-74) 
Episode 20 (12 Dec 73)
Episode 21 (19 Dec 73)
New Year Special (31 Dec 73)
Episode 23 (7 Jan 74)
Episode 24 (14 Jan 74)
Episode 25 (21 Jan 74)
Episode 26 (28 Jan 74)
Episode 27 (4 Feb 74)

Series 5 (1974) 
Episode 28 (11 Feb 74)
Episode 29 (18 Feb 74)
Episode 30 (25 Feb 74)
Episode 31 (4 Mar 74)
Episode 32 (11 Mar 74)
Episode 33 (18 Mar 74)

Series 6 (1975) 
Episode 34 (2 Jan 75)
Episode 35 (9 Jan 75)
Episode 36 (16 Jan 75)
Episode 37 (23 Jan 75)
Episode 38 (30 Jan 75)
Episode 39 (6 Feb 75)
Episode 40 (13 Feb 75)

Series 7 (1975) 
Episode 41 (17 Apr 75)
Episode 42 (24 Apr 75)
Episode 43 (1 May 75)
Episode 44 (8 May 75)
Episode 45 (15 May 75)
Episode 46 (22 May 75)
Episode 47 (1 Jan 76)

Series 8 (1975-76) 
Episode 48 (11 Dec 75)
Episode 49 (18 Dec 75)
Christmas Special (25 Dec 75)
Episode 51 (8 Jan 76)
Episode 52 (15 Jan 76)
Episode 53 (22 Jan 76)

References

Lists of British sitcom episodes